Crimean Directorate of Railway Transportation – directorate of Near-Dnipro Railways (branch of Ukrzaliznytsya). Management services to the Autonomous Republic of Crimea and Sevastopol. By March 2014 also south-eastern part of Kherson and south-western parts of Zaporozhye region. In the management of living about 2.5 million people.

March 15, 2014 as a result of the annexation of Crimea by Russia actually came under the management of Russian Railways called "FSUE "Crimea Railway"". 
Location management – Simferopol station. Other major stations – Dzhankoy, Sevastopol, Evpatoria resort, Feodosia and Kerch.

History 
For the first time on the Crimean Peninsula Railway was in 1854–1856 years between Sevastopol and Balaklava, when the region during the Crimean War was under the tutelage of the UK. Railroad freight shipped from Balaklava Bay to the front. But in 1856, when the United Kingdom in accordance with the Paris peace had to give Sevastopol Russians railway was dismantled by the British away and rails sold to Turkey.

Railway communication between the Crimean peninsula and the mainland Empire was opened only in 1875. Built Russian tycoon PI Gubonin Sevastopol railway linking the station Lozova, which at that time was connected with Kharkov and Moscow. In 1895 the railway was also laid to Feodosia. In the late 1880s – early 1900s was seen as the railway construction project from Sevastopol to Yalta, but the days of the empire he was not realized, as in Soviet times, was recognized as dangerous due to the high seismicity of the region.

Basic Lines 
 Electrified single track railway Yevpatoria – Ostryakova
 Electrified single track railway Sevastopol – Simferopol
 No-Electrified single track railway Theodosius – Vladyslavivka (at the station Kerch – Djankoi)

Passenger traffic 
Crimean crisis in the summer of 2014 passenger traffic increased several times since the railway management activities provided in the most popular area with tourists – in the Crimea. After the cessation of December 27, 2014 of passenger and freight traffic from mainland Ukraine Crimea railroad started to play only local significance.

Gallery

See also 
 Crimean Directorate of Railway Transportation on ukrainian lang.

Ukrainian Railways
Transport in Crimea